National Assembly elections were held in the Republic of China on 23 March 1996, the first direct presidential election was also held on the same day. The result was a victory for the Kuomintang, which won 183 of the 334 seats. Voter turnout was 76.2%.

Results

References

Taiwan
Taiwanese National Assembly elections
1996 elections in Taiwan